The Free List (FL) is a green political party in Liechtenstein. As of 2017, it has three seats in the Landtag of Liechtenstein and is represented in six of the eleven local councils. It was founded in 1985 and described itself as social-democratic and green.

Electoral history

Landtag elections

References

External links
  

Political parties in Liechtenstein
Social democratic parties in Europe
Green parties in Europe
Political parties established in 1985
1985 establishments in Liechtenstein